Aeroflot Flight 3519 was a Tupolev Tu-154B-2 airline flight on a domestic route from Krasnoyarsk to Irkutsk on 23 December 1984. Shortly after takeoff, the No. 3 engine caught fire, and the airplane crashed during an emergency landing. This killed 110 people; there was only one survivor, and the aircraft was destroyed. The engine fire was caused by a manufacturing defect in the compressor disk.

Accident details
On 23 December 1984, at 2:08 p.m. The weather was clear with good visibility. This was due to a metallurgical and manufacturing defect in the first stage low pressure compressor disk. The flight engineer mistakenly shut down the No. 2 (center) engine; ten seconds later, he realized his error and attempted to restart it. The crew then began to turn the aircraft around for an emergency landing. The No. 3 engine was shut off and the crew unsuccessfully fired extinguishing bottles. Without warning, the No. 2 engine began turning at takeoff speed and could not be controlled by the engine power levers. The crew was able to shut it off, but the fuel valve remained open. By that time, the fire from the No. 3 engine had spread to the pylon and the auxiliary power unit in the rear compartment and continued to spread to the No. 2 engine. The fire damaged the aircraft's electrical system, causing the voltage to drop and the hydraulics to fail.

Due to the extensive fire damage that left the aircraft with only one functional engine, the crew was unable to control the plane. It banked to the right and crashed into the runway at 2:15 pm at a 50-degree angle. The time between the start of the fire and the crash was four minutes and 30 seconds. The only survivor was one passenger, a 27-year-old man, who was badly injured. The other 110 people aboard the aircraft were killed. The aircraft was destroyed and partially burned in the crash.

Technical data and statistics
The aircraft's initial flight was in 1979.

The weather did not play a role in the crash.

Of the 104 passengers aboard, five were children. There were seven crew members. Of the 111 people aboard, all of the crew and 103 passengers were killed in the crash. No ground injuries or casualties were reported.

See also
List of sole survivors of airline accidents or incidents

References

Aviation accidents and incidents in 1984
Accidents and incidents involving the Tupolev Tu-154
Aviation accidents and incidents in the Soviet Union
1984 in the Soviet Union
Aviation accidents and incidents in Russia
3519
December 1984 events in Asia
Airliner accidents and incidents caused by in-flight fires
Airliner accidents and incidents caused by engine failure
Airliner accidents and incidents involving uncontained engine failure